This is a list of tunnels documented by the Historic American Engineering Record in the U.S. state of Pennsylvania.

Tunnels

See also
List of bridges documented by the Historic American Engineering Record in Pennsylvania

References

Tunnels
List
Tunnels
Tunnels, historic
Pennsylvania